Wake Up is an extended play (EP) by the British rapper Sway. It was released on 20 October 2013 through 3Beat under exclusive license to All Around the World. The title track is produced by BBC Radio 1 DJ Zane Lowe. "No Sleep" featuring KSI and Tigger Da Author has received widespread recognition from KSI's YouTube fanbase. An official music video for the song premiered on 20 October 2013, and in two days had accumulated almost a million views. The single version of the song also features Tubes from Soccer AM. "Back Someday" features uncredited vocals from Ed Sheeran. "No Sleep" reached number 34 in the UK Midweeks Chart, and on Sunday entered the UK Singles Chart at number 44.

Track listing

Notes
  signifies a co-producer
  signifies a remixer
"Wake Up" samples "Fight the Power (Part 1 & 2)" by The Isley Brothers.
"Back Someday" features vocals from Ed Sheeran.

Chart performance

For "No Sleep"
Chart positions listed for "No Sleep".

For "Wake Up"
Chart positions listed for "Wake Up".

Release history

References

2013 debut EPs
Hip hop EPs
Sway (musician) albums